The Sfântu Gheorghe branch is a distributary of the river Danube, that contributes in forming the Danube Delta.

This is the southernmost branch of the Danube; the other two main branches are the Chilia branch and the Sulina branch.

Distributaries of the Danube